Hogan's Alley is a 1925 American silent comedy film produced and distributed by Warner Bros. It was an early directing assignment for Roy Del Ruth and starred Monte Blue, Patsy Ruth Miller, and Ben Turpin. This film is a precursor to the silent film One Round Hogan, a later Monte Blue boxing vehicle.

Plot
As described in a review in a film magazine, Patsy (Miller) is the scrappy little daughter of an ignorant lazy Irishman (Louis) who lives in Hogan's Alley. Her sweetheart Lefty O'Brien (Blue) is a prize-fighter, but this does not suit her father who wants her to marry a rich man. Lefty is arrested when his opponent in the fight fails to regain consciousness. Patsy is hurt and Lefty calls Dr. Franklin (Barrie), a swell doctor who takes a shine to Patsy and invites her and her father to his lodge. He proves to be a villain who attempts to sweep her off her feet. Lefty follows their train but his car is wrecked by the locomotive. With Patsy now on a runaway train, Lefty hires an airplane and transfers from it to the train, knocks out the villain, and stops the engine just before it runs into a landslide.

Cast

Preservation status
Hogan's Alley survives in an incomplete or abridged version in the French archive Centre national du cinéma et de l'image animée in Fort de Bois-d'Arcy.

References

External links

1925 films
American silent feature films
Films directed by Roy Del Ruth
1925 comedy films
Silent American comedy films
American black-and-white films
1920s American films